St Andrew's Church was a congregation of the Church of Scotland in the British overseas territory of Gibraltar and was part of the Presbytery of Europe. The church was opened in 1854. Whilst originally built primarily to serve as a garrison church for Scottish soldiers based in Gibraltar,it served the wider Presbyterian and Reformed Christian community of all nationalities.

The church was run by a committee of elders. Until 2008, the church shared its ministers with the Costa del Sol congregation in Spain. As of June 2009, and until the Church's closure in December 2022, the church's minister was Rev. Ewen Maclean.

The church is located on Governor's Parade, a small square which they share with the Garrison Library, the O'Callaghan Eliott Hotel and the previous location of the Gibraltar Chronicle.

In December 2022 the building is to close as a Church of Scotland place of worship. A farewell service, attended by Sir David Steel, Governor of Gibraltar, took place on 20th November 2022. Video from GTV available to watch, dated 21st November 2022.

Services
 Sundays - 10:30
 Weekdays (open church) - 11:00-13:00

References

Church of Scotland churches
Churches in Gibraltar
Presbyterian churches in Europe
1854 establishments in Europe
Religious organizations established in 1854